69/96 is the second studio album by Japanese musician Cornelius. It was released on November 1, 1995 by Trattoria Records. The album peaked at number three on the Oricon Albums Chart. A remix album titled 96/69 was released the following year.

Track listing

Notes
 Tracks 17 to 68 and 70 to 95 are silent.

Personnel
Credits are adapted from the album's liner notes.

Musicians

 Keigo Oyamada – vocals, 12-string, acoustic, and electric guitars, ukulele, harp, sitar, electric sitar, kazoo, sounds, conducting, arrangement
 Asa-Chang – drums (tracks 2, 3, 8, 10, 11, 13–15), percussion (tracks 2, 6, 11, 15), noises (track 3), trumpet (track 15)
 Bonzow – drums (track 8)
 Bryan Burton-Lewis – vocals (track 9)
 Reon Daniels – vocals (track 1)
 Ellie – vocals (track 1)
 Hirohisa Horie – Hammond B-3 organ (track 2)
 Riki Imanari – sound manipulation (tracks 2–14)
 Wornell Jones – vocals (track 1)
 Monsieur Kamayatsu – vocals (track 5)
 Kahimi Karie – vocals (track 11)
 Daisuke Kawai – Wurlitzer piano (tracks 3, 14), clavinet (tracks 5, 7), Hammond B-3 organ (track 10), synthesizer (track 10)
 Kinbara Strings – strings (tracks 12, 14)
 Maki Kitada – bass (tracks 2, 3, 6, 8, 13–15)
 Toyoaki Mishima – sound manipulation (tracks 2–14)
 Masaya Nakahara – noises (tracks 2, 14)
 Takashi Ozaki – pedal steel guitar (tracks 3, 11, 15)
 Pink Sabbath – noises (tracks 8, 12, 14)
 Vagabond Suzuki – bass (track 10)
 Yoshié Toda – drums (tracks 6, 10)
 Hitoshi Watanabe – bass (tracks 3, 11), bass sitar (track 6), ukulele (track 15)
 Nobuo Yagi – blues harp (track 11), harp (track 13)
 Moog Yamamoto – turntables (tracks 2, 3, 6, 8–10, 13, 14)
 Sugar Yoshinaga – TB-303 synthesizer and electric guitar (track 4)

Production

 Keigo Oyamada – production
 Yuka Koizumi – mastering
 Ken Makimura – executive production
 Ichiro Oka – production direction and management
 Michifumi Onodera – mixing (assistant), recording (assistant)
 Tohru Takayama – mixing (tracks 1–3, 5–15), recording
 Shojiro Watanabe – mixing (track 4)

Design

 Keigo Oyamada – art direction, artwork concept, photography
 Gen Inaba – photography
 Kahimi Karie – photography
 Masakazu Kitayama – design
 Masaya Nakahara – T-shirt design
 Akemi Nakano – face painting
 Hiroshi Nomura – photography
 Mitsuo Shindō – art direction, artwork concept
 Skate Thing – T-shirt design
 Hiroko Umeyama – props

Charts

References

External links
 
 

1995 albums
Cornelius (musician) albums
Japanese-language albums